Josh or Joshua  Lewis may refer to:

Josh Lewis (rugby league) (born 1985), Australian rugby league footballer
Josh Lewis (guitarist) (born 1967), guitarist with Warrant 
Josh Lewis (Emmerdale), a character on the British soap opera Emmerdale
Josh Lewis (rugby union) (born 1992),  Welsh rugby union player
Joshua Lewis (judge) (1772–1833), judge in the Territory of Orleans and Louisiana